Irwin Magnetic Systems was a computer storage manufacturer founded in 1979 and based in Ann Arbor, Michigan.  At its height, the company employed 600 people in Ann Arbor.  The company's primary product lines were magnetic tape data storage systems, most popularly the proprietary AccuTrak format. This format was widely adopted by Compaq, Hewlett-Packard and other OEM manufacturers; it was also incorporated into IBM Personal System/2 (PS/2) personal computers as an option. In 1989, the company was acquired by Cipher Data Products for US$77 million. Cipher was in turn acquired by Archive Corporation a year later. Archive maintained Irwin as an independent brand for a while after the acquisition.

Notable products 
 EzTape – backup and restore software
 AccuTrak Plus – 120-MB and 250-MB tape drives

References

1979 establishments in Michigan
1989 disestablishments in Michigan
1989 mergers and acquisitions
American companies established in 1979
American companies disestablished in 1989
Companies based in Ann Arbor, Michigan
Computer companies established in 1979
Computer companies disestablished in 1989
Defunct computer companies of the United States
Defunct computer hardware companies